Long Pond is a  cold water pond in Plymouth, Massachusetts, east of Myles Standish State Forest, Halfway Pond and Round Pond, west of Route 3 at Exit 3 and The Pinehills, northwest of Bloody Pond, and north of West Wind Shores. It is fed by groundwater and an inlet from Little Long Pond, and drains through the pond bottom. A paved boat ramp provided by the Public Access Board with ample parking spaces is easily accessible from Route 3. The Pond has a 50 hp limitation on boating.

Long Pond village
The village of the same name to the southwest of the pond includes Faunce Church .

See also
Neighborhoods in Plymouth, Massachusetts
Plymouth, Massachusetts

References

External links
 Mass Division of Fisheries and Wildlife - Pond Maps
Six Ponds Improvement Association

Ponds of Plymouth, Massachusetts
Villages in Plymouth, Massachusetts
Villages in Massachusetts
Ponds of Massachusetts